Prior to 1985 the New Zealand armed forces received the same Meritorious and Long Service Awards awarded in the United Kingdom. Since the end of World War 2 there have been constant moves towards an independent New Zealand honours system. This has resulted in a new system of New Zealand honours, gallantry and bravery awards, and campaign medals.

The following are a list, in order of precedence as defined in references below. Those Meritorious and Long Service medals which have been independently issued by New Zealand to its armed forces are in bold.

Commemoration Medals
  New Zealand 1990 Commemoration Medal (for Sesquicentennial)
  New Zealand Suffrage Centennial Medal 1993 (for Women's suffrage)

Meritorious & Long Service Medals
  New Zealand Territorial Service Medal
  New Zealand Long and Efficient Service Medal
  New Zealand Meritorious Service Medal
  New Zealand Defence Meritorious Service Medal
  New Zealand Police Meritorious Service Medal
  New Zealand Public Service Medal
  New Zealand Armed Forces Award
  New Zealand Army Long Service and Good Conduct Medal
  Royal New Zealand Navy Long Service and Good Conduct Medal
  Royal New Zealand Air Force Long Service and Good Conduct Medal
  New Zealand Police Long Service and Good Conduct Medal
  NZ Fire Brigades Long Service & Good Conduct Medal
  NZ Prison Service Medal
  New Zealand Traffic Service Medal
  New Zealand Customs Service Medal
  Efficiency Decoration
  Efficiency Medal
  RNZN Reserve Decoration
  RNZN Volunteer Reserve Decoration
  RNZN Volunteer Reserve Long Service & Good Conduct Medal
  Air Efficiency Award
  Cadet Forces Medal
  New Zealand Defence Service Medal

Other awards
  Queens Medal for Champion Shots (Army)
  Queens Medal for Champion Shots (Navy)
  Queens Medal for Champion Shots (Air Force)

References

External links
New Zealand Honours overview on DPMC website
New Zealand medals on NZDF website (see NZDF)

 
New Zealand Royal Honours System